Spicospina is a genus of ground-dwelling frogs in the family Myobatrachidae. It is monotypic, being represented by the single species, Spicospina flammocaerulea, also known as the sunset frog. First discovered in the year 1994, it is native to south-western Western Australia. It is known from only 27 sites, all occurring east and northeast of Walpole.

Description 
Spicospina flammocaerulea is a small species, with a snout-vent length of 31-36 mm in the females and males growing to 29.5-34.8 mm. The physical appearance and colouration differs greatly from all other Australian frog species. It is a shiny dark-purple to black or very dark grey on the dorsal surface. There are orange markings below the vent, around the margins of the body and on the hands and feet that resemble the sunset. The throat, chest and the underside of the hands and feet are also orange. The back is granular with many raised glands, a large parotoid gland is located behind each eye. The belly has vivid light blue spotting on a dark background which is smooth. The fingers and toes are free from webbing and pads.

Ecology and behaviour 
The sunset frog is only found in isolated permanently moist peat swamps, in high rainfall areas. These sites have high moisture content and are often protected from drier conditions by seepages that provide water even through the drier seasons (spring and summer). Males call between October and December from shallow pools, water seepages or in open water along creek margins. They make a rapidly repeated "dd-duk-duk". Females lay less than 200 eggs that are deposited singly often supported by algae mats just below the surface of the water.

Conservation efforts 
On the 19th of December 2011, the DEC in combination with Perth Zoo released 31 captive-bred endangered sunset frogs and 251 tadpoles into a private property in Mt Frankland area in order to extend the known range of the species.

References  

Frogs Australia Network
DEC

Amphibians of Western Australia
Myobatrachidae
Vulnerable fauna of Australia
Monotypic amphibian genera
Frogs of Australia
Endemic fauna of Southwest Australia
Warren bioregion